Krasnoarmeysky District may refer to:
Krasnoarmeysky District, Russia, name of several districts and city districts in Russia
Krasnoarmiisk Raion (Krasnoarmeysky District), former name of Pokrovsk Raion, a district of Donetsk Oblast, Ukraine

District name disambiguation pages